The 117th Infantry Division (117. Infanterie-Division) was a formation of the Imperial German Army in World War I. The division was formed on April 2, 1915, and organized over the next several weeks. It was part of a wave of new infantry divisions formed in the spring of 1915. The division was disbanded in 1919, during the demobilization of the German Army after World War I.

The division was formed primarily from the excess infantry regiments of regular infantry divisions that were being triangularized. The division's 233rd Infantry Brigade staff had been the staff of the 23rd Reserve Infantry Brigade of the 12th Reserve Division, which came to the new division along with the 22nd Reserve Infantry Regiment. The 11th Reserve Infantry Regiment had been part of the 11th Reserve Division. The 157th Infantry Regiment came from the 12th Infantry Division. The division was recruited in Silesia.

Combat chronicle

The 117th Infantry Division began fighting on the Western Front in World War I, entering the line in the Champagne region. It then fought in the Second Battle of Artois and the Autumn Battle by La Bassée and Arras, which included the Battle of Loos. It remained in the trenches in Flanders and the Artois until February 1916, and then was in the line on the Yser until July. It then fought in the Battle of the Somme. In August 1916, the division was transferred to the Eastern Front, arriving in Carpathia later in the month. It faced the Russians in Carpathia until late 1917, when it went into combat against the Romanians. In October 1917, the division was transferred to Italy, and went into the line on the Isonzo Front. It fought in the Battle of Caporetto and the follow-on offensive to the Piave River. The division remained in Italy until March 1918, when it returned to the Western Front. It fought in the Battle of the Lys, also known at the Fourth Battle of Ypres. It remained in the line, and fought against several Allied offensives, including the Meuse-Argonne Offensive. It was facing the Allies between the Meuse and Beaumont when the Armistice came into effect. Allied intelligence rated the division as second class.

Order of battle on formation

The order of battle of the 117th Infantry Division on April 5, 1915, was as follows:

 233. Infanterie-Brigade
 Reserve-Infanterie-Regiment Nr. 11
 Reserve-Infanterie-Regiment Nr. 22
 4. Schlesisches Infanterie-Regiment Nr. 157
 1.Eskadron/Kürassier-Regiment Graf Geßler (Rheinisches) Nr. 8
 2.Eskadron/Kürassier-Regiment Graf Geßler (Rheinisches) Nr. 8
 Feldartillerie-Regiment Nr. 233
 Fußartillerie-Batterie Nr. 117
 Pionier-Kompanie Nr. 233

Late-war order of battle

The division underwent relatively few organizational changes over the course of the war. Cavalry was reduced, artillery and signals commands were formed, and combat engineer support was expanded to a full pioneer battalion. The order of battle on May 16, 1918, was as follows:

 233. Infanterie-Brigade
 Reserve-Infanterie-Regiment Nr. 11
 Reserve-Infanterie-Regiment Nr. 22
 4. Schlesisches Infanterie-Regiment Nr. 157
 1.Eskadron/Kürassier-Regiment Graf Geßler (Rheinisches) Nr. 8
 Artillerie-Kommandeur 117
 Feldartillerie-Regiment Nr. 233
 Fußartillerie-Bataillon Nr. 88
 Pionier-Bataillon Nr. 117
 Pionier-Kompanie Nr. 233
 Pionier-Kompanie Nr. 263
 Minenwerfer-Kompanie Nr. 117
 Divisions-Nachrichten-Kommandeur 117

References
 117. Infanterie-Division (Chronik 1915/1918) - Der erste Weltkrieg
 Hermann Cron et al., Ruhmeshalle unserer alten Armee (Berlin, 1935)
 Hermann Cron, Geschichte des deutschen Heeres im Weltkriege 1914–1918 (Berlin, 1937)
 Günter Wegner, Stellenbesetzung der deutschen Heere 1825–1939. (Biblio Verlag, Osnabrück, 1993), Bd. 1
 Histories of Two Hundred and Fifty-One Divisions of the German Army which Participated in the War (1914–1918), compiled from records of Intelligence section of the General Staff, American Expeditionary Forces, at General Headquarters, Chaumont, France 1919 (1920)

Notes

Infantry divisions of Germany in World War I
Military units and formations established in 1915
Military units and formations disestablished in 1919
1915 establishments in Germany